Carl William Buehner (December 27, 1898 – November 11, 1974) was a general authority of the Church of Jesus Christ of Latter-day Saints (LDS Church) from 1952 to 1961 and was the Republican Party candidate for governor of Utah in the 1968 election.

Buehner was born in Stuttgart, Germany. As a child, his family emigrated to Salt Lake City, Utah. Buehner was a graduate of the Illinois Institute of Technology in Chicago.

Prior to his call as a general authority, Buehner served in the LDS Church as a bishop and stake president and was a member of the Church Welfare Committee. In 1952, he was called as second counselor to the church's Presiding Bishop Joseph L. Wirthlin. He served in this capacity until 1961, when Wirthlin was succeeded by John H. Vandenburg.

Immediately following his release, Buehner was called as second assistant to Joseph T. Bentley in the general superintendency of the church's Young Men's Mutual Improvement Association. When Bentley was succeeded by G. Carlos Smith in 1962, Buehner again served as second assistant until 1967, when he was succeeded by George R. Hill.

Buehner later served as a regional representative. He was also president of the Great Salt Lake Council of the Boy Scouts of America. He was awarded the Silver Beaver for his contribution to the Boy Scouts.

In 1968, Buehner was nominated by the Utah Republican Party as a candidate for the state governorship. Buehner was defeated easily by Democratic incumbent Cal Rampton.

Buehner died in Salt Lake City. He was married to Lucille Thurman and they were the parents of four children.

Buehner was quoted as saying, "They may forget what you said — but they will never forget how you made them feel." in Richard Evans' Quote Book, a 1971 compilation of quotations of prominent figures in the LDS church. This quote is often misattributed to many others including Maya Angelou.

See also
Thorpe B. Isaacson
Marvin J. Ashton
F. Enzio Busche

Notes

References
“Carl W. Buehner Dies, Ending Life of Service,” Ensign, January 1975, p. 79
Deseret Morning News Church Almanac, 2007
1971, Richard Evans’ Quote Book by Richard L. Evans, (“Selected from the ‘Spoken Word’ and ‘Thought for the Day’ and from many inspiring thought-provoking sources from many centuries”) Quote Page 244, Column 2, Publishers Press, Salt Lake City, Utah. (Verified with scans; thanks to the librarians of Harold B. Lee Library, Brigham Young University, Provo, Utah)

External links
Grampa Bill's G.A. Pages: Carl W. Buehner

1898 births
1974 deaths
American general authorities (LDS Church)
Counselors in the General Presidency of the Young Men (organization)
German emigrants to the United States
German general authorities (LDS Church)
Illinois Institute of Technology alumni
Counselors in the Presiding Bishopric (LDS Church)
Utah Republicans
Regional representatives of the Twelve
Latter Day Saints from Utah